The women's 4 × 400 metres relay races at the 2000 Summer Olympics as part of the athletics program were held on Friday, 29 September and Saturday, 30 September. The first two in each heat and the next 2 fastest overall advanced to the final.

Coming from the gun, Nigeria's Olabisi Afolabi was the first to break from the stagger formation in lane 3, gaining on Australia's Nova Peris-Kneebone to her outside.  After the first half lap, Afolabi began to pay for her enthusiasm, tying up through the second turn where American Jearl Miles Clark and then Jamaican Sandie Richards began to assert themselves.  The Jamaicans handed off slightly ahead of the Americans, but Monique Hennagan ran a strong turn to give the Americans the edge ahead of Catherine Scott, with the rest of the world, led by Nigeria and Australia, five metres back.  Scott kept the gap less than a metre all the way to the home stretch, then moved into lane two to sprint for home, passing off to 400 hurdles silver medalist Deon Hemmings just ahead of Marion Jones.  But Hemmings did not charge out ahead, instead allowing Jones to secure the baton.  Narrowing the gap, Nigeria, Australia, Great Britain and Russia were all just a few metres back. Hemmings held second place to that same straightaway, but a late rush by Olga Kotlyarova had Russia handing off in second place. With no competitors near her, LaTasha Colander expanded the American lead to almost 20 metres with 100 metres to go before slowing going into the finish.  Graham held off Privalova for the entire last lap.  Cathy Freeman made a heroic effort to pull Australia back into fourth position, but let off the gas just before the line and was pipped by Falilat Ogunkoya.  Australia's time was good enough for the Oceanian record, beating the record they set in the qualifying round.

Records
These were the standing world and Olympic records (in minutes:seconds) prior to the 2000 Summer Olympics.

Medals

* Athletes who participated in the heats only and received medals.

On 23 November 2007, the IAAF recommended to the IOC Executive Board to disqualify the USA women's 4 × 100 m and 4 × 400 m relay teams after Marion Jones admitted to having taken performance-enhancing drugs prior to the Games. On 12 December, the IOC disqualified Jones and stripped her of her relay medals but it did not disqualify the U.S. relay teams. On 10 April 2008, the IOC disqualified both U.S. relay teams and asked for Jones' teammates' medals to be returned. France (Linda Ferga, Muriel Hurtis, Fabe Dia, Christine Arron, Sandra Citte*) finished fourth in the  relay in a time of 42.42, and Nigeria (Olabisi Afolabi, Opara Charity, Rosemary Okafor, Falilat Ogunkoya-Osheku, Doris Jacob*) finished fourth in the  relay in a time of 3:23.80.
All members of the U.S. relay teams except Nanceen Perry then appealed to the Court of Arbitration for Sport who on 16 July 2010 ruled in favor of them due to the fact that, according to the rules at the time, a team should not be disqualified because of a doping offense of one athlete. The rule that an entire team be disqualified and required to vacate medals on the instance of one offender was imposed in 2003.  Their medals were then restored to them because the penalty was based on a policy imposed ex post facto, which is prohibited by the CAS.

Results
All times shown are in seconds.
 Q denotes qualification by place in heat.
 q denotes qualification by overall place.
 DNS denotes did not start.
 DNF denotes did not finish.
 DQ denotes disqualification.
 NR denotes national record.
 AR denotes area/continental record.
 OR denotes Olympic record.
 WR denotes world record.
 PB denotes personal best.
 SB denotes season best.

Heats
First 2 in each heat(Q) and the next 2 fastest(q) advance to the Final.

Heat 1

Heat 2

Heat 3

Final

References

External links
Results, round 1 – IAAF
Results, final – IAAF
 Source: Official Report of the 2000 Sydney Summer Olympics available at  https://web.archive.org/web/20080522105330/http://www.la84foundation.org/5va/reports_frmst.htm

4 x 400 metres relay women
Relay foot races at the Olympics
2000 in women's athletics
Women's events at the 2000 Summer Olympics